James Pendleton Vandiver (1869–1932) was a Kentucky fiddler, born there shortly after the American Civil War. He was the uncle to bluegrass musician Bill Monroe, who immortalized him in a song, "Uncle Pen".

Monroe used to hear his uncle playing fiddle on the hilltop where he lived, while Monroe put away his mules at night. He later said that Vandiver was "the fellow that I learned how to play from." Vandiver played fiddle at local square dances and social events, and his nephew backed him up, playing mandolin. Monroe's parents had both died by the time he was 16, and he lived part of the time with his Uncle Pen, in his two-room hilltop house in Rosine, Kentucky. Vandiver had been crippled earlier, and he made some money with his music. Bill Monroe's biographer, Richard D. Smith writes, "Pen gave Bill more: a repertoire of tunes that sank into Bill's aurally trained memory and a sense of rhythm that seeped into his bones. Sometimes Bill played guitar behind his uncle, sometimes the mandolin."

On September 13, 1973, a monument in honor of Uncle Pen was unveiled by Monroe at the Rosine Cemetery. Another way he honored Penn's memory was to play the part of "Uncle Penn" in Ricky Skaggs' Country Boy music video.

References

External links

Biography of two influences on Bill Monroe, Pendleton Vandiver and Arnold Schultz
Chapter one of Can't You Hear Me Callin': The Life of Bill Monroe, Father of Bluegrass by Richard D. Smith. Contains information on Vandiver family and a description of Uncle Pen.

Genealogy page for James Pendleton Vandiver

1869 births
1932 deaths
Old-time musicians
People from Butler County, Kentucky